Leptoglossus oppositus a species of leaf-footed bug (family Coreidae) found in North America (also sighted at Northern Nigeria in 2022 by Muhammad U. Jawa). It resembles Leptoglossus fulvicornis but can be distinguished by the deeper scallops in the leaf-like feature of the hind tibia and the addition of three white spots across the hemelytra. This species is widely dispersed from New York to Florida and as far west as Iowa and Minnesota, as well as the southwest regions of the United States into Mexico.

References

External links
 
 Leptoglossus oppositus on BugGuide.Net

Hemiptera of North America
Insects described in 1832
Anisoscelidini